Graham Harman (born May 9, 1968) is an American philosopher and academic. He is Distinguished Professor of Philosophy at the Southern California Institute of Architecture in Los Angeles. His work on the metaphysics of objects led to the development of object-oriented ontology. He is a central figure in the speculative realism trend in contemporary philosophy.

Biography
Harman was born in Iowa City and raised in Mount Vernon, Iowa. He received a B.A. from St. John's College in Annapolis, Maryland in 1990, and went on to graduate school at Penn State University to earn a master's degree, studying under philosopher Alphonso Lingis, in 1991. While pursuing a Ph.D. at DePaul University, Harman worked as an online sports reporter, an experience which he credits for developing his writing style and productivity. After finishing his degree in 1999 he joined the Department of Philosophy at the American University in Cairo, where he taught from 2000-2016, leaving at the rank of Distinguished University Professor. He has also been a visiting faculty member at the University of Amsterdam, University of Turin, and Yale University. Since 2013 he has been a faculty member at the European Graduate School.

Philosophical work
Harman starts the development of his work with Martin Heidegger's concept of "tool-analysis" from Being and Time. To Harman, tool-analysis was a key discovery which establishes the groundwork for taking seriously the autonomous existence of objects and, in doing so, highlights deficiencies in phenomenology due to its subordination of objects to their use by or relationship with humans.

Harman is considered part of the speculative realism trend, a nebulous grouping of philosophers united by two perspectives: a rejection of anthropocentric "philosophies of access" which privilege the perspective of humans in relation to objects, and a support of metaphysical realism via rejection of "correlationism", an assumption in post-Kantian philosophy that fellow speculative realist Quentin Meillassoux defines as "the idea according to which we only ever have access to the correlation between thinking and being, and never to either term considered apart from the other." Following the early conception of metaphor in the work of the Spanish philosopher José Ortega y Gasset, in which both humans and non-humans are treated not as correlates of one another but as having equally rich independent lives, Harman's object-oriented approach considers the life of objects to be fertile ground for a metaphysics that works to overcome anthropocentrism and correlationism.

According to Harman, everything is an object, whether it be a mailbox, a shadow, spacetime, a fictional character, or the Commonwealth of Nations. However, drawing on phenomenology, he does distinguish between two categories of objects: real objects and sensual objects (or intentional objects), which sets his philosophy apart from the flat ontology of Bruno Latour.

Harman defines real objects as inaccessible and infinitely withdrawn from all relations and then puzzles over how such objects can be accessed or enter into relations: "by definition, there is no direct access to real objects. Real objects are incommensurable with our knowledge, untranslatable into any relational access of any sort, cognitive or otherwise. Objects can only be known indirectly. And this is not just the fate of humans — it’s the fate of everything."

Central to Harman's philosophy is the idea that real objects are inexhaustible: "A police officer eating a banana reduces this fruit to a present-at-hand profile of its elusive depth, as do a monkey eating the same banana, a parasite infecting it, or a gust of wind blowing it from a tree. Banana-being is a genuine reality in the world, a reality never exhausted by any relation to it by humans or other entities." (Harman 2005: 74). Because of this inexhaustibility, claims Harman, there is a metaphysical problem regarding how two objects can ever interact. His solution is to introduce the notion of "vicarious causation", according to which objects can only ever interact on the inside of an "intention" (which is also an object).

Cutting across the phenomenological tradition, and especially its linguistic turn, Harman deploys a brand of metaphysical realism that attempts to extricate objects from their human captivity and metaphorically allude to a strange subterranean world of "vacuum-sealed" objects-in-themselves: "The comet itself, the monkey itself, Coca-Cola itself, resonate in cellars of being where no relation reaches."

Strongly sympathetic to panpsychism, Harman proposes a new philosophical discipline called "speculative psychology" dedicated to investigating the "cosmic layers of psyche" and "ferreting out the specific psychic reality of earthworms, dust, armies, chalk, and stone." Harman does not, however, unreservedly endorse an all-encompassing panpsychism and instead proposes a sort of 'polypsychism' that nonetheless must "balloon beyond all previous limits, but without quite extending to all entities". He continues by stating that "perceiving" and "non-perceiving" are not different kinds of objects, but can be found in the same entity at different times: "The important point is that objects do not perceive insofar as they exist, as panpsychism proclaims. Instead they perceive insofar as they relate."

Harman rejects scientism on account of its anthropocentrism: "For them, raindrops know nothing and lizards know very little, and some humans are more knowledgeable than others."

Bibliography

Authored works
 2002. Tool-Being: Heidegger and the Metaphysics of Objects (Open Court Publishing)
 2005. Guerrilla Metaphysics: Phenomenology and the Carpentry of Things (Open Court Publishing)
 2007. Heidegger Explained: From Phenomenon to Thing (Open Court Publishing)
 2009. Prince of Networks: Bruno Latour and Metaphysics (re.press)
 2010. Towards Speculative Realism: Essays and Lectures (Zero Books)
 2010. Circus Philosophicus (Zero Books)
 2010. L'objet quadruple (Presses Universitaires de France; republished in English as The Quadruple Object, 2011, Zero Books).   
 2011. The Prince and the Wolf: Latour and Harman at the LSE (Zero Books, with Bruno Latour and Peter Erdélyi)
 2011. Quentin Meillassoux: Philosophy in the Making (Edinburgh University Press)
 2012. Weird Realism: Lovecraft and Philosophy (Zero Books) 
 2013. Bells and Whistles: More Speculative Realism (Zero Books)
 2014. Bruno Latour: Reassembling the Political (Pluto Press)  
 2016. Immaterialism: Objects and Social Theory (Polity Press)  
 2016. Dante's Broken Hammer: The Ethics, Aesthetics, and Metaphysics of Love (Repeater Books)  
 2017. The Rise of Realism (Polity Press, with Manuel DeLanda) 
 2018. Object-Oriented Ontology: A New Theory of Everything (Pelican Books)  
 2018. Speculative Realism: An Introduction (Polity Press)
 2020. Art and Objects (Polity Press)
 2020. Is There an Object-Oriented Architecture? Engaging Graham Harman (Bloomsbury)
 2020. Skirmishes: With Friends, Enemies, and Neutrals (Punctum Books)
 2021. Artful Objects: Graham Harman on Art and the Business of Speculative Realism (Sternberg Press)
 2022. Architecture and Objects (University of Minnesota Press)
 2023. The Graham Harman Reader (Zero Books)
 2023. Objects Untimely: Object-Oriented Philosophy and Archaeology (Polity Press, with Christopher Witmore)

Edited works
 The Speculative Turn: Continental Materialism and Realism (2011, re.press, with co-editors Levi Bryant and Nick Srnicek)
 Editor of the "Speculative Realism" series, published by Edinburgh University Press
 Editor of the "New Metaphysics" series, published by Open Humanities Press
 Editor-in-Chief of Open Philosophy'', published by De Gruyter

See also

 Speculative Realism
 Object-oriented ontology
 Object-oriented writing
 Ian Bogost
 Levi Bryant
 Timothy Morton

References

External links
 New home page 2016 at Southern California Institute of Architecture (SCI-Arc)
 Home page 2016 at the American University in Cairo (AUC) and versions (with a few extra links) at an older URL
 Object-Oriented Philosophy
 numerous posts and links of Harman's talks, abstracts etc.
 Audio recordings of Harman's talks
 Frieze on Graham Harman
 Webpage for Collapse journal featuring contributions by Graham Harman and other "speculative realists"
 16 unpublished articles
 Robert Nelson: Philosopher
 On the Horror of Phenomenology: Lovecraft and Husserl
 Interview/podcast with Graham Harman (2013)
 Figure/Ground interview
 On the Ontology of Aesthetic Objects: Graham Harman's Dante's Broken Hammer--by Rolando Pérez

1968 births
20th-century American architects
20th-century American essayists
20th-century American journalists
20th-century American male writers
20th-century American philosophers
20th-century educational theorists
21st-century American architects
21st-century American essayists
21st-century American journalists
21st-century American male writers
21st-century American philosophers
21st-century educational theorists
Abstract object theory
Academics from Iowa
Action theorists
American architecture critics
American architecture writers
American educational theorists
American ethicists
American expatriates in Egypt
American literary critics
American male essayists
American philosophy academics
American sports journalists
American sportswriters
Academic staff of The American University in Cairo
Architects from Iowa
American consciousness researchers and theorists
Continental philosophers
DePaul University alumni
Educators from Iowa
Epistemologists
Academic staff of European Graduate School
Heidegger scholars
H. P. Lovecraft scholars
Journalists from Iowa
Linguistic turn
Literacy and society theorists
Living people
Metaphysicians
Metaphysics writers
Ontologists
Pennsylvania State University alumni
People from Mount Vernon, Iowa
Phenomenologists
Philosophers from Iowa
Philosophers of art
Philosophers of culture
Philosophers of education
Philosophers of language
Philosophers of literature
Philosophers of love
Philosophers of mind
Philosophers of psychology
Philosophers of science
Social philosophers
Southern California Institute of Architecture faculty
St. John's College (Annapolis/Santa Fe) alumni
Academic staff of the University of Amsterdam
Academic staff of the University of Turin
Writers from Iowa
Yale University faculty